Wendi Deng Murdoch (born Deng Wenge; December 5, 1968) is a Chinese-born American entrepreneur, investor, movie producer, media mogul, and collector of Chinese contemporary art.

Early life and education
Wendi Deng was born in Jinan, Shandong and raised in Xuzhou, Jiangsu. Her birth name was Deng Wenge,, Deng, the family name, and Wenge meaning "Cultural Revolution". She has two older sisters, and a brother, and both of her parents were engineers. When she was a teen she changed her given name to "Wendi".

She attended Xuzhou First Secondary School (a.k.a. Xuzhou No.1 Middle School). She became a competitive volleyball player. While she was in high school, her father relocated to Guangzhou, where he was a factory director at the People's Machinery Works; she and her family remained in Xuzhou until they joined their father a short time later. At the age of 16, she was enrolled at the Guangzhou Medical College.

In 1988, she left medical school and went to the United States on a study permit. She enrolled at California State University, Northridge, where she studied economics and was among the top scoring students. She obtained a BA in Economics from California State University at Northridge and an MBA from Yale University.

Career and public profile

Star TV Hong Kong 
Upon graduation from Yale in 1996, Deng met Bruce Churchill. At that time, Churchill oversaw finance and corporate development at the Fox TV branch in Los Angeles. He offered Deng an internship at News Corp subsidiary Star TV in Hong Kong, which developed into a full-time junior executive position. Though a junior employee,  she took a role in working to plan Star TV's operations in Hong Kong and China and helped to build up Chinese distribution for Star's Channel V music channel. Within one year, she became a vice president. Additionally, she investigated interactive TV opportunities for News Digital Systems.

Artsy 
In 2009, Murdoch co-founded the online platform Artsy with Carter Cleveland and Dasha Zhukova, which has since become one of the top online places for buying, viewing and learning about art. Other investors include Peter Thiel, François Pinault and Eric Schmidt.

MySpace 
Murdoch was an advisor for MySpace's China operation, prior to the company's sale to Specific Media in June 2011.

Chinese internet investor 
She led the Murdoch family's Chinese internet investments and helped form business links with China for high-speed video and internet access.

Film production 
In 2011, Murdoch co-produced her first film with Florence Sloan, Snow Flower and the Secret Fan, a movie about two footbound children in Qing dynasty China, directed by Wayne Wang. The film won the Golden Angel Award at the Chinese American Film Festival.

She also produced the Netflix documentary Sky Ladder which showcased the art of Cai Guo-Qiang and directed by Academy Award-winning director Kevin MacDonald. The film premiered in January 2016 at the Sundance Film Festival. Sotheby's hosted a private reception and screening of the film in October 2016 before the film's Netflix debut.

Other investments 
Murdoch invested in tech start-ups including Oscar, Snapchat, Uber and Warby Parker.

Board memberships 

 Artsy
 Asia Society
 Co-hosted the Met Gala in 2015
 Chairwoman for Friends of the Metropolitan Museum of Art Costume Institute Benefit.
 Yale School of Management
Panthera
Match Group

Personal life 

Jake and Joyce Cherry hosted Deng in their home during her studies in the United States.  Later, Jake Cherry left his wife, and married Wendi Deng in 1990. While married to Cherry, Wendi obtained a green card. Their marriage lasted 2 years and 7 months when they divorced. Jake later said that they stayed together for only four to five months when he learned that Deng was spending time with David Wolf, a man closer to her age.

In 1997, she met Rupert Murdoch, who is 37 years her senior, while working as an executive at the Murdoch-owned Star TV in Hong Kong. They married in 1999 on board his yacht "Morning Glory", less than three weeks after the finalization of his divorce from his second wife, Anna Murdoch. The couple had two children, Grace (born 2001) and Chloe (born 2003). Tony Blair is Grace Murdoch's godfather. In June 2013, Rupert Murdoch filed for divorce from Deng, citing irreconcilable differences.

On July 19, 2011, Wendi Murdoch attacked Jonathan May-Bowles (comedian Jonnie Marbles) after he threw a pie at her husband Rupert Murdoch while he was giving testimony before a British parliamentary committee considering the News International phone hacking scandal. May-Bowles was subsequently sentenced to six weeks' imprisonment.

In February 2014, The Daily Telegraph and Vanity Fair alleged that Wendi Murdoch might have had an affair with former UK Prime Minister Tony Blair. An article in The Economist claimed that as a result of Rupert Murdoch's suspicion that Blair had an affair with his wife, he ended his long-standing association with Blair in 2014.

In early 2018, The Wall Street Journal published a story suggesting that Jared Kushner and Ivanka Trump, longtime friends of Murdoch, were warned by US intelligence agencies that Murdoch may be using her relationship with them to further the goals of the Chinese government. Michael Wolff, author of Fire and Fury: Inside the Trump White House, posited that the article was an attempt by Rupert Murdoch, owner of The Wall Street Journal, to spread the idea that "Wendi is a Chinese spy" in the aftermath of their acrimonious divorce.

Murdoch lives in New York City with her two daughters. Grace goes to Yale University, and Chloe studies at Stanford.

See also 
 Chinese Americans in New York City

References

External links
 Official website 

 
 
 
  (discusses the WikiScanner data in the editing of this Wikipedia article on Wendi )
  Chinese MySpace page, photos and blog
 Adams, William Lee. "Wendi : The Life and Times of Mrs. Rupert Murdoch." TIME.
 Wendi leaping to Rupert Murdoch’s defence during the attack with a pie in July 2011, Telegraph.co.uk

1968 births
Living people
American computer businesspeople
American expatriates in Hong Kong
American media executives
American women in business
Businesspeople from Los Angeles
Businesspeople from New York City
California State University, Northridge alumni
Chinese emigrants to the United States
Film producers from California
Murdoch family
Myspace
News Corporation people
People associated with the News International phone hacking scandal
People from Beverly Hills, California
Businesspeople from Jinan
People from Greenwich Village
People from Xuzhou
Yale School of Management alumni
People from Carmel-by-the-Sea, California
People with acquired American citizenship